Tickford Racing (formerly known as Prodrive Racing Australia and Ford Performance Racing) is an Australian motor racing team which competes in the Supercars Championship. The team currently campaigns four Ford Mustangs, with their current drivers being James Courtney, Cameron Waters, Thomas Randle and Declan Fraser. Tickford Racing also competes in the Super2 Series with Brad Vaughan and Elly Morrow.

The team has won the Bathurst 1000 twice, in 2013 (Winterbottom/Richards) and in 2014 (Mostert/Morris). They have won the driver's championship once, in 2015 with Mark Winterbottom.

History

2000s
In December 2002, Prodrive purchased Glenn Seton Racing, and renamed it Ford Performance Racing as part of a marketing push to link the Prodrive-owned Ford Performance Vehicles road car range to the popular V8 Supercars. Along with this renaming came a huge expansion programme – the team expanded from one car driven by Glenn Seton to three; Seton, Craig Lowndes and David Besnard. The team moved into a new headquarters adjacent to the FPV factory in Campbellfield, Melbourne, and the crew expanded as well. The third car was entered using Rod Nash Racing's Racing Entitlement Contract (REC). While other teams such had received major Ford support in the years since, it became the first official Ford factory team since the Ford Works Team of 1962 to 1973.

The team's early years were somewhat disappointing, given the fact the team was one of the best funded in V8 Supercars. Lowndes had his moments in 2003, including a round win at Phillip Island, and a second-place finish at Bathurst driving with Seton. Lowndes finished the year 5th in the championship, with Seton and Besnard well down the order. In 2004, the team downsized to two cars. Lowndes and Seton both had disappointing years, plagued by engine dramas, a lack of test days, and a lack of comparable data (their cars were built to different specifications). While the pair did start to find some pace at the end of the year (they finished second at Bathurst again), they both decided to move at the end of the year – Lowndes to Triple Eight Race Engineering and Seton to Dick Johnson Racing.

Jason Bright and Greg Ritter joined for the 2005 season. Bright had a consistent year, and finished inside the top 10, while Ritter was disappointing, David Brabham replaced him for the final two rounds. In 2006, Mark Winterbottom joined the team. Bright scored multiple front-row starts, including three pole positions. He won the inaugural round in Bahrain, the Desert 400, and came 6th in the championship. Winterbottom enjoyed a very consistent run to finish third in the championship. The pair won the Sandown 500. FPR came second in the team's championship behind the HSV Dealer Team.

Bright left FPR at the end of the 2006 season to drive for his own Britek Motorsport outfit, with Steven Richards recruited to replace him. The team continued to take the challenge to the front-running teams. The most disappointing moment in 2007 was when Winterbottom left the circuit late in the race while leading at Bathurst. In 2008 Winterbottom challenged for the championship, but Jamie Whincup managed to finish the championship ahead of Winterbottom while Richards finished 8th.

In 2009, the new FG Falcon was debuted. While Triple Eight already had the speed, FPR struggled with only one win from Mark Winterbottom during the season with Steven Richards finishing a best of 3rd. The team also struggled at Bathurst again with the No. 6 car driven by Winterbottom and Richards caught fire on lap 50 while the second car driven by Dean Canto and Luke Youlden crashed late in the race. Mark Winterbottom and Steven Richards finished 5th and 13th in the championship.

2010s
In 2010, Winterbottom finished 3rd and Richards 15th. For 2011, Will Davison replaced Richards, who was retained as an endurance co-driver for Winterbottom. Winterbottom finished in 3rd place for the championship while Davison finished in 7th. In 2012, FPR were strong challengers for the championship, Winterbottom finishing 3rd with Davison finishing 4th.

In January 2013, the team was sold by Prodrive to Rusty French and Rod Nash. In the 2013 season, Mark Winterbottom and Steven Richards won the Bathurst 1000. Davison finished the season in third, Winterbottom fourth. Chaz Mostert joined the team in 2014, replacing Will Davison. FPR won the 2014 Bathurst 1000 with Mostert partnered by Paul Morris.

In 2015, Ford Performance Racing was renamed as Prodrive Racing Australia, as a result of Ford's decision to progressively withdraw its V8 Supercars support by 2016. The team introduced the Ford FG X Falcon, the first new Falcon since 2009. After a slow start, the team achieved considerable success in the next section of the season, with eleven out of fifteen race wins between the third event (the Perth Super Sprint) and the eighth event (the Sydney Motorsport Park Super Sprint). Winterbottom, co-driving with Steve Owen, then went on to win the 2015 Wilson Security Sandown 500, leading home a team one-two with Mostert and Cameron Waters in second. It was the team's first win at the event since 2006. At the 2015 Supercheap Auto Bathurst 1000, Mostert had a substantial crash in Friday qualifying, ruling his car out for the weekend and himself out for the rest of the season. This left Winterbottom with a large championship lead entering the final rounds, and while he didn't win another race after Sandown, Winterbottom held on to win his, and the team's first drivers' championship. The team was leading the teams' championship until the final round, in which it was overtaken by long-time rivals Triple Eight.

In 2016, Mostert was moved to customer team Rod Nash Racing for sponsorship purposes, with Cameron Waters joining the team full-time in car No. 6 alongside defending champion Winterbottom. The team only won 2 races, both with Winterbottom who finished the championship in 6th place. Waters finished his first season in 19th, with his best finish being 4th place at the Bathurst 1000 with Jack Le Brocq. In 2017 the team continued with the same driver lineup, with its only race win being the Sandown 500 with Waters and co-driver Richie Stanaway. Winterbottom finished the championship in 6th, while Waters finished in 8th place.

In 2018, the team was rebranded as Tickford Racing, with Stanaway joining the team in car No. 56. The Rod Nash Racing REC was moved to the team with Mostert, officially making Tickford Racing a 4 car team.

Customer cars

Rod Nash Racing

From 2010 to 2017, the team has prepared a customer car for Rod Nash Racing. Paul Dumbrell drove in 2010 and 2011 before David Reynolds took over in 2012, with notable results being a race win at the 2013 Armor All Gold Coast 600, a second place at the 2012 Supercheap Auto Bathurst 1000 and 3rd in the driver's championship in 2015, with Dean Canto as his co-driver. From 2016, Chaz Mostert raced with Rod Nash Racing, winning 3 races and the Pirtek Enduro Cup the following season with Steve Owen. The Rod Nash Racing REC is now run under the Tickford Racing name with Mostert and Owen.

Team 18

In 2013, the team took on a second customer car for Team 18. The Schwerkolt entry was driven by Alex Davison in 2013, with Jack Perkins replacing Davison for 2014. Schwerkolt and his team split with FPR prior to the 2015 season, moving to Walkinshaw Racing for 2015.

Super Black Racing

Super Black Racing replaced the No. 18 Schwerkolt entry for 2015, with Andre Heimgartner the driver of Car No. 111. Chris Pither replaced Heimgartner for the final two rounds of the 2015 season and continued with the team for 2016. After the 2016 season, the team sold its Racing Entitlement Contract to Tim Blanchard Racing.

Britek Motorsport

In 2017, Britek Motorsport replaced Super Black Racing as the team's second customer entry. Team owner Jason Bright drove the team's No. 56 entry with Garry Jacobson co-driving. After 2017, Bright retired from full-time driving and the REC was leased to Matt Stone Racing.

23Red Racing

After running its first Supercars season on its own, 23Red Racing became a satellite operation for 2019 with Tickford re-building the teams Ford Falcon into a Ford Mustang for the 2019 season. The car was driven by Will Davison, a former driver of FPR. In May 2020, 23Red Racing announced it was withdrawing from the Supercars Championship, due to the loss of their major backer Milwaukee Tools. This was a result of the economic impacts from the COVID-19 pandemic.  The team was merged back to Tickford with a new number.

Other
Tickford Racing has run a number of customer cars for other franchise holders, the first in 2007 where the No. 021 Team Kiwi Racing BF Falcon driven by Paul Radisich was prepared for the first few rounds of the season. In 2008, FPR prepared the No. 777 Ford Rising Stars Racing BF Falcon of Michael Patrizi. For the 2015 Supercheap Auto Bathurst 1000, the team ran a third customer car, a wildcard entry for Renee Gracie and Simona de Silvestro known as the Harvey Norman Super Girls.

Super2 Series
The team has also run entries in the second-tier Dunlop Super2 Series in recent years. The first of these was in 2010 when the team ran James Moffat in a BF Falcon. This was followed by entering Chaz Mostert in 2011 and 2012 using an FG Falcon. In 2014 and 2015, the team ran Cameron Waters in an older generation (pre-2013) FG Falcon in the Development Series, winning the championship in 2015.

In 2016, the team expanded to two (2015-spec) FG X Falcon entries for Garry Jacobson and Jack Le Brocq. The pairing finished first and second in the championship respectively. In 2017, the team continued to run FG X Falcons, for defending champion Jacobson and Josh Kean. They also ran a wildcard entry at the Sydney round with Richie Stanaway, who achieved two 3rd-place finishes and a race win in the 4 races held. Jacobson finished the championship in 6th position while Kean finished in 19th. For 2018 and 2019 the team only fielded one FG X Falcon for Thomas Randle. In 2020, the team will field reigning Super3 champion Broc Feeney in one FG X Falcon. In 2021 the team will field Zak Best in the same FG X Falcon used by Broc Feeney.

Results

Car No. 5 results 
{| class="wikitable mw-collapsible mw-collapsed" style="text-align:center; font-size:75%"
! Year
! Driver
! No.
! Make
! 1
! 2
! 3
! 4
! 5
! 6
! 7
! 8
! 9
! 10
! 11
! 12
! 13
! 14
! 15
! 16
! 17
! 18
! 19
! 20
! 21
! 22
! 23
! 24
! 25
! 26
! 27
! 28
! 29
! 30
! 31
! 32
! 33
! 34
! 35
! 36
! 37
! 38
! 39
! 40
! 
! Pts
|-
|-
! 2003
! rowspan=2| Glenn Seton
! rowspan=12| 5 
! rowspan=22| Ford
|style="background: #dfffdf"| ADER1
|style="background: #dfffdf"| ADER1
|style="background: #dfffdf"| PHIR3
|style="background: #dfffdf"| EASR4
|style="background: #dfffdf"| WINR5
|style="background: #dfffdf"| BARR6
|style="background: #dfffdf"| BARR7
|style="background: #dfffdf"| BARR8
|style="background: #efcfff"| HDVR9
|style="background: #dfffdf"| HDVR10
|style="background: #dfffdf"| HDVR11
|style="background: #efcfff"| QLDR12
|style="background: #efcfff"| ORAR13
|style="background: #dfffdf"| SANR14
|style="background: #dfdfdf"| BATR15
|style="background: #dfffdf"| SURR16
|style="background: #dfffdf"| SURR17
|style="background: #dfffdf"| PUKR18
|style="background: #dfffdf"| PUKR19
|style="background: #dfffdf"| PUKR20
|style="background: #dfffdf"| EASR21
|style="background: #efcfff"| EASR22
!colspan=18|
! 15th
! 1266
|-
! 2004
|style="background: #dfffdf"| ADER1
|style="background: #efcfff"| ADER2
|style="background: #dfffdf"| EASR3
|style="background: #dfffdf"| PUKR4
|style="background: #dfffdf"| PUKR5
|style="background: #dfffdf"| PUKR6
|style="background: #dfffdf"| HDVR7
|style="background: #dfffdf"| HDVR8
|style="background: #dfffdf"| HDVR9
|style="background: #dfffdf"| BARR10
|style="background: #dfffdf"| BARR11
|style="background: #efcfff"| BARR12
|style="background: #dfffdf"| QLDR13
|style="background: #dfffdf"| WINR14
|style="background: #ffffff"| ORAR15
|style="background: #dfffdf"| ORAR16
|style="background: #dfffdf;"| SANR17
|style="background: #dfdfdf;"| BATR18
|style="background: #dfffdf"| SURR19
|style="background: #dfffdf"| SURR20
|style="background: #dfffdf"| SYMR21
|style="background: #dfffdf"| SYMR22
|style="background: #dfffdf"| SYMR23
|style="background: #dfffdf"| EASR24
|style="background: #dfffdf"| EASR25
|style="background: #dfffdf"| EASR26
!colspan=14|
! 15th
! 1237
|-
! 2006
! rowspan=13| Mark Winterbottom
|style="background: #dfffdf"| ADER1
|style="background: #dfffdf"| ADER2
|style="background: #dfffdf"| PUKR3
|style="background: #ffdf9f"| PUKR4
|style="background: #ffdf9f"| PUKR5
|style="background: #dfffdf"| BARR6
|style="background: #dfffdf"| BARR7
|style="background: #ffdf9f"| BARR8
|style="background: #dfffdf"| WINR9
|style="background: #dfffdf"| WINR10
|style="background: #dfffdf"| WINR11
|style="background: #ffdf9f"| HDVR12
|style="background: #dfffdf"| HDVR13
|style="background: #dfffdf"| HDVR14
|style="background: #dfffdf"| QLDR15
|style="background: #dfffdf"| QLDR16
|style="background: #dfffdf"| QLDR17
|style="background: #dfffdf"| ORAR18
|style="background: #dfffdf"| ORAR19
|style="background: #dfffdf"| ORAR20
|style="background: #ffffbf"| SANR21
|style="background: #efcfff"| BATR22
|style="background: #ffdf9f"| SURR23
|style="background: #ffdf9f"| SURR24
|style="background: #ffdf9f"| SURR25
|style="background: #dfdfdf"| SYMR26
|style="background: #dfdfdf"| SYMR27
|style="background: #ffdf9f"| SYMR28
|style="background: #dfffdf"| BHRR29
|style="background: #ffdf9f"| BHRR30
|style="background: #dfffdf"| BHRR31
|style="background: #dfffdf"| PHIR32
|style="background: #dfdfdf"| PHIR33
|style="background: #ffffbf"| PHIR34
!colspan=6|
!style="background: #ffdf9f"| 3rd
!style="background: #ffdf9f"| 3089
|-
! 2007
|style="background: #dfffdf"| ADER1
|style="background: #efcfff"| ADER2
|style="background: #dfffdf"| BARR3
|style="background: #dfffdf"| BARR4
|style="background: #dfffdf"| BARR5
|style="background: #dfdfdf"| PUKR6
|style="background: #cfcfff"| PUKR7
|style="background: #dfffdf"| PUKR8
|style="background: #cfcfff"| WINR9
|style="background: #cfcfff"| WINR10
|style="background: #dfffdf"| WINR11
|style="background: #dfffdf"| EASR12
|style="background: #dfffdf"| EASR13
|style="background: #dfffdf"| EASR14
|style="background: #efcfff"| HDVR15
|style="background: #dfffdf"| HDVR16
|style="background: #dfffdf"| HDVR17
|style="background: #dfffdf"| QLDR18
|style="background: #dfffdf"| QLDR19
|style="background: #dfffdf"| QLDR20
|style="background: #dfffdf"| ORAR21
|style="background: #ffdf9f"| ORAR22
|style="background: #cfcfff"| ORAR23
|style="background: #dfffdf"| SANR24
|style="background: #dfffdf"| BATR25
|style="background: #cfcfff"| SURR26
|style="background: #cfcfff"| SURR27
|style="background: #dfffdf"| SURR28
|style="background: #ffffbf"| BHRR29
|style="background: #ffffbf"| BHRR30
|style="background: #ffdf9f"| BHRR31
|style="background: #ffdf9f"| SYMR32
|style="background: #ffdf9f"| SYMR33
|style="background: #dfffdf"| SYMR34
|style="background: #dfffdf"| PHIR35
|style="background: #dfffdf"| PHIR36
|style="background: #dfffdf"| PHIR37
!colspan=3|
! 5th
! 420
|-
! 2008
|style="background: #dfdfdf"| ADER1
|style="background: #efcfff"| ADER2
|style="background: #dfffdf"| EASR3
|style="background: #dfdfdf"| EASR4
|style="background: #ffffbf"| EASR5
|style="background: #dfffdf"| HAMR6
|style="background: #dfffdf"| HAMR7
|style="background: #dfffdf"| HAMR8
|style="background: #ffffbf"| BARR29
|style="background: #ffffbf"| BARR10
|style="background: #ffffbf"| BARR11
|style="background: #dfdfdf"| SANR12
|style="background: #dfffdf"| SANR13
|style="background: #dfdfdf"| SANR14
|style="background: #ffffbf"| HDVR15
|style="background: #ffdf9f"| HDVR16
|style="background: #dfdfdf"| HDVR17
|style="background: #dfdfdf"| QLDR18
|style="background: #ffffbf"| QLDR19
|style="background: #ffffbf"| QLDR20
|style="background: #dfffdf"| WINR21
|style="background: #dfdfdf"| WINR22
|style="background: #dfffdf"| WINR23
|style="background: #dfffdf"| PHIQR
|style="background: #dfffdf"| PHIR24
|style="background: #dfffdf"| BATR25
|style="background: #ffdf9f"| SURR26
|style="background: #ffdf9f"| SURR27
|style="background: #ffdf9f"| SURR28
|style="background: #dfffdf"| BHRR29
|style="background: #dfffdf"| BHRR30
|style="background: #dfffdf"| BHRR31
|style="background: #ffdf9f"| SYMR32
|style="background: #dfffdf"| SYMR33
|style="background: #dfffdf"| SYMR34
|style="background: #dfffdf"| ORAR35
|style="background: #dfffdf"| ORAR36
|style="background: #dfffdf"| ORAR37
!colspan=2|
!style="background: #dfdfdf"| 2nd
!style="background: #dfdfdf"| 3079
|-
! 2009
|style="background: #dfffdf"| ADER1
|style="background: #dfffdf"| ADER2
|style="background: #dfdfdf"| HAMR3
|style="background: #efcfff"| HAMR4
|style="background: #dfffdf"| WINR5
|style="background: #dfdfdf"| WINR6
|style="background: #dfffdf"| SYMR7
|style="background: #dfffdf"| SYMR8
|style="background: #dfdfdf"| HDVR9
|style="background: #dfffdf"| HDVR10
|style="background: #dfffdf"| TOWR11
|style="background: #dfffdf"| TOWR12
|style="background: #dfffdf"| SANR13
|style="background: #dfffdf"| SANR14
|style="background: #ffdf9f"| QLDR15
|style="background: #dfffdf"| QLDR16
|style="background: #ffffbf"| PHIQR
|style="background: #ffdf9f"| PHIR17
|style="background: #efcfff"| BATR18
|style="background: #ffffbf"| SURR19
|style="background: #dfdfdf"| SURR20
|style="background: #dfdfdf"| SURR21
|style="background: #ffffbf"| SURR22
|style="background: #dfffdf"| PHIR23
|style="background: #efcfff"| PHIR24
|style="background: #ffdf9f"| BARR25
|style="background: #dfffdf"| BARR26
|style="background: #dfdfdf"| SYDR27
|style="background: #ffdf9f"| SYDR28
!colspan=11|
! 5th
! 2414
|- 
! 2010
|style="background: #ffdf9f"| YMCR1
|style="background: #dfdfdf"| YMCR2
|style="background: #dfdfdf"| BHRR3
|style="background: #dfdfdf"| BHRR4
|style="background: #dfffdf"| ADER5
|style="background: #ffdf9f"| ADER6
|style="background: #dfffdf"| HAMR7
|style="background: #000000; color:white"| HAMR8
|style="background: #dfffdf"| QLDR9
|style="background: #efcfff"| QLDR10
|style="background: #dfffdf"| WINR11
|style="background: #dfffdf"| WINR12
|style="background: #ffffbf"| HDVR13
|style="background: #dfdfdf"| HDVR14
|style="background: #ffdf9f"| TOWR15
|style="background: #ffffbf"| TOWR16
|style="background: #dfffdf"| PHIQR
|style="background: #dfdfdf"| PHIR17
|style="background: #dfffdf"| BATR18
|style="background: #dfffdf"| SURR19
|style="background: #ffdf9f"| SURR20
|style="background: #dfffdf"| SYMR21
|style="background: #ffffbf"| SYMR22
|style="background: #ffdf9f"| SANR23
|style="background: #dfdfdf"| SANR24
|style="background: #efcfff"| SYDR25
|style="background: #efcfff"| SYDR26
!colspan=13|
!style="background: #ffdf9f"| 3rd
!style="background: #ffdf9f"| 2729
|-
! 2011
|style="background: #ffdf9f"| YMCR1
|style="background: #dfffdf"| YMCR2
|style="background: #dfffdf"| ADER3
|style="background: #ffdf9f"| ADER4
|style="background: #dfffdf"| HAMR5
|style="background: #efcfff"| HAMR6
|style="background: #dfffdf"| BARR7
|style="background: #dfffdf"| BARR8
|style="background: #dfffdf"| BARR9
|style="background: #dfffdf"| WINR10
|style="background: #dfffdf"| WINR11
|style="background: #dfffdf"| HIDR12
|style="background: #ffdf9f"| HIDR13
|style="background: #dfffdf"| TOWR14
|style="background: #ffdf9f"| TOWR15
|style="background: #dfffdf"| QLDR16
|style="background: #dfffdf"| QLDR17
|style="background: #dfffdf"| QLDR18
|style="background: #dfffdf"| PHIR19
|style="background: #dfffdf"| BATR20
|style="background: #ffdf9f"| SURR21
|style="background: #ffffbf"| SURR22
|style="background: #dfffdf"| SYMR23
|style="background: #ffdf9f"| SYMR24
|style="background: #dfffdf"| SANR25
|style="background: #dfdfdf"| SANR26
|style="background: #dfffdf"| SYDR27
|style="background: #ffffbf"| SYDR28
!colspan=12|
!style="background: #ffdf9f"| 3rd
!style="background: #ffdf9f"| 2710
|-
! 2012
|style="background: #dfffdf"| ADER1
|style="background: #dfdfdf"| ADER2
|style="background: #dfdfdf"| SYMR3
|style="background: #dfffdf"| SYMR4
|style="background: #dfffdf"| HAMR5
|style="background: #ffffbf"| HAMR6
|style="background: #ffffbf"| BARR7
|style="background: #ffdf9f"| BARR8
|style="background: #dfdfdf"| BARR9
|style="background: #ffffbf"| PHIR10
|style="background: #dfffdf"| PHIR11
|style="background: #ffdf9f"| HIDR12
|style="background: #ffdf9f"| HIDR13
|style="background: #dfdfdf"| TOWR14
|style="background: #dfffdf"| TOWR15
|style="background: #dfdfdf"| QLDR16
|style="background: #dfdfdf"| QLDR17
|style="background: #dfdfdf"| SMPR18
|style="background: #ffdf9f"| SMPR19
|style="background: #dfffdf"| SANQR
|style="background: #dfdfdf"| SANR20
|style="background: #dfffdf"| BATR21
|style="background: #ffdf9f"| SURR22
|style="background: #ffdf9f"| SURR23
|style="background: #dfffdf"| YMCR24
|style="background: #dfffdf"| YMCR25
|style="background: #dfffdf"| YMCR26
|style="background: #dfffdf"| WINR27
|style="background: #dfdfdf"| WINR28
|style="background: #dfffdf"| SYDR29
|style="background: #dfffdf"| SYDR30
!colspan=9|
!style="background: #ffdf9f"| 3rd
!style="background: #ffdf9f"| 3457
|-
! 2013
|style="background: #efcfff"| ADER1
|style="background: #dfffdf"| ADER2
|style="background: #ffdf9f"| SYMR3
|style="background: #dfffdf"| SYMR4
|style="background: #dfdfdf"| SYMR5
|style="background: #dfffdf"| PUKR6
|style="background: #dfffdf"| PUKR7
|style="background: #dfffdf"| PUKR8
|style="background: #dfffdf"| PUKR9
|style="background: #ffdf9f"| BARR10
|style="background: #ffdf9f"| BARR11
|style="background: #dfffdf"| BARR12
|style="background: #dfffdf"| COAR13
|style="background: #dfffdf"| COAR14
|style="background: #dfffdf"| COAR15
|style="background: #dfffdf"| COAR16
|style="background: #dfffdf"| HIDR17
|style="background: #ffffbf"| HIDR18
|style="background: #dfdfdf"| HIDR19
|style="background: #dfdfdf"| TOWR20
|style="background: #dfffdf"| TOWR21
|style="background: #ffdf9f"| QLDR22
|style="background: #dfffdf"| QLDR23
|style="background: #ffdf9f"| QLDR24
|style="background: #dfffdf"| WINR25
|style="background: #ffffbf"| WINR26
|style="background: #dfffdf"| WINR27
|style="background: #cfcfff"| SANQR
|style="background: #dfffdf"| SANR28
|style="background: #ffffbf"| BATR29
|style="background: #ffdf9f"| SURR30
|style="background: #dfffdf"| SURR31
|style="background: #dfffdf"| PHIR32
|style="background: #dfffdf"| PHIR33
|style="background: #dfdfdf"| PHIR34
|style="background: #efcfff"| SYDR35
|style="background: #dfffdf"| SYDR36
!colspan=3|
! 4th
! 2793
|-
! 2014
|style="background: #dfffdf"| ADER1
|style="background: #dfffdf"| ADER2
|style="background: #dfffdf"| ADER3
|style="background: #ffdf9f"| SYMR4
|style="background: #dfdfdf"| SYMR5
|style="background: #dfffdf"| SYMR6
|style="background: #dfffdf"| WINR7
|style="background: #dfdfdf"| WINR8
|style="background: #ffffbf"| WINR9
|style="background: #dfffdf"| PUKR10
|style="background: #ffffbf"| PUKR11
|style="background: #dfdfdf"| PUKR12
|style="background: #ffffbf"| PUKR13
|style="background: #dfffdf"| BARR14
|style="background: #dfdfdf"| BARR15
|style="background: #ffdf9f"| BARR16
|style="background: #dfffdf"| HIDR17
|style="background: #dfffdf"| HIDR18
|style="background: #ffffbf"| HIDR19
|style="background: #dfffdf"| TOWR20
|style="background: #dfffdf"| TOWR21
|style="background: #dfffdf"| TOWR22
|style="background: #dfffdf"| QLDR23
|style="background: #dfffdf"| QLDR24
|style="background: #dfffdf"| QLDR25
|style="background: #dfffdf"| SMPR26
|style="background: #dfffdf"| SMPR27
|style="background: #dfffdf"| SMPR28
|style="background: #cfcfff"| SANQR
|style="background: #dfffdf"| SANR29
|style="background: #dfffdf"| BATR30
|style="background: #dfffdf"| SURR31
|style="background: #dfffdf"| SURR32
|style="background: #dfffdf"| PHIR33
|style="background: #ffdf9f"| PHIR34
|style="background: #ffdf9f"| PHIR35
|style="background: #dfffdf"| SYDR36
|style="background: #dfffdf"| SYDR37
|style="background: #dfffdf"| SYDR38
!colspan=1|
!style="background: #ffdf9f"| 3rd
!style="background: #ffdf9f"| 2768
|-
! 2015
|style="background: #dfffdf"| ADER1
|style="background: #dfffdf"| ADER2
|style="background: #dfffdf"| ADER3
|style="background: #dfdfdf"| SYMR4
|style="background: #dfffdf"| SYMR5
|style="background: #dfffdf"| SYMR6
|style="background: #ffffbf"| BARR7
|style="background: #ffffbf"| BARR8
|style="background: #dfffdf"| BARR9
|style="background: #dfdfdf"| WINR10
|style="background: #ffffbf"| WINR11
|style="background: #ffffbf"| WINR12|style="background: #dfdfdf"| HIDR13
|style="background: #dfffdf"| HIDR14
|style="background: #dfffdf"| HIDR15
|style="background: #ffffbf"| TOWR16|style="background: #ffffbf"| TOWR17|style="background: #ffffbf"| QLDR18|style="background: #ffffbf"| QLDR19
|style="background: #ffdf9f"| QLDR20
|style="background: #dfdfdf"| SMPR21
|style="background: #dfffdf"| SMPR22
|style="background: #dfffdf"| SMPR23
|style="background: #cfcfff"| SANQR
|style="background: #ffffbf"| SANR24
|style="background: #dfdfdf"| BATR25
|style="background: #dfffdf"| SURR26
|style="background: #dfffdf"| SURR27
|style="background: #dfffdf"| PUKR28
|style="background: #dfffdf"| PUKR29
|style="background: #dfffdf"| PUKR30
|style="background: #dfffdf"| PHIR31
|style="background: #dfffdf"| PHIR32
|style="background: #dfffdf"| PHIR33
|style="background: #dfffdf"| SYDR34
|style="background: #ffdf9f"| SYDR35
|style="background: #dfffdf"| SYDR36
!colspan=3|
!style="background: #ffffbf"| 1st
!style="background: #ffffbf"| 3246
|-
! 2016
! rowspan=1| 1
|style="background: #dfffdf"| ADER1
|style="background: #dfffdf"| ADER2
|style="background: #dfffdf"| ADER3
|style="background: #dfffdf"| SYMR4
|style="background: #ffdf9f"| SYMR5
|style="background: #dfffdf"| PHIR6
|style="background: #dfdfdf"| PHIR7
|style="background: #dfffdf"| BARR8
|style="background: #ffffbf"| BARR9
|style="background: #ffdf9f"| WINR10
|style="background: #dfdfdf"| WINR11
|style="background: #dfffdf"| HIDR12
|style="background: #dfffdf"| HIDR13
|style="background: #ffdf9f"| TOWR14
|style="background: #ffdf9f"| TOWR15
|style="background: #dfffdf"| QLDR16
|style="background: #dfffdf"| QLDR17
|style="background: #dfffdf"| SMPR18
|style="background: #dfffdf"| SMPR19
|style="background: #cfcfff"| SANQR
|style="background: #dfffdf"| SANR20
|style="background: #efcfff"| BATR21
|style="background: #dfffdf"| SURR22
|style="background: #dfffdf"| SURR23
|style="background: #dfffdf"| PUKR24
|style="background: #dfffdf"| PUKR25
|style="background: #ffffbf"| PUKR26
|style="background: #dfffdf"| PUKR27
|style="background: #dfffdf"| SYDR28
|style="background: #dfffdf"| SYDR29
!colspan=10|
! 6th
! 2489
|-
! 2017
! rowspan=7| 5
|style="background: #dfffdf"| ADER1
|style="background: #dfffdf"| ADER2
|style="background: #cfcfff"| SYMR3
|style="background: #dfffdf"| SYMR4
|style="background: #dfffdf"| PHIR5
|style="background: #dfdfdf"| PHIR6
|style="background: #dfffdf"| BARR7
|style="background: #dfffdf"| BARR8
|style="background: #dfffdf"| WINR9
|style="background: #dfffdf"| WINR10
|style="background: #dfffdf"| HIDR11
|style="background: #dfffdf"| HIDR12
|style="background: #ffdf9f"| TOWR13
|style="background: #dfffdf"| TOWR14
|style="background: #dfffdf"| QLDR15
|style="background: #dfffdf"| QLDR16
|style="background: #dfffdf"| SMPR17
|style="background: #dfffdf"| SMPR18
|style="background: #cfcfff"| SANQR
|style="background: #dfffdf"| SANR19
|style="background: #efcfff"| BATR20
|style="background: #dfffdf"| SURR21
|style="background: #dfffdf"| SURR22
|style="background: #dfdfdf"| PUKR23
|style="background: #dfffdf"| PUKR24
|style="background: #dfffdf"| NEWR25
|style="background: #dfffdf"| NEWR26
!colspan=13|
! 6th
! 2208
|-
! 2018
|style="background: #dfffdf"| ADER1
|style="background: #dfffdf"| ADER2
|style="background: #dfffdf"| MELR3
|style="background: #dfffdf"| MELR4
|style="background: #dfffdf"| MELR5
|style="background: #dfffdf"| MELR6
|style="background: #dfffdf"| SYMR7
|style="background: #dfffdf"| SYMR8
|style="background: #dfffdf"| PHIR9
|style="background: #dfffdf"| PHIR10
|style="background: #dfdfdf"| BARR11
|style="background: #dfffdf"| BARR12
|style="background: #dfffdf"| WINR13
|style="background: #dfffdf"| WINR14
|style="background: #dfffdf"| HIDR15
|style="background: #dfffdf"| HIDR16
|style="background: #dfffdf"| TOWR17
|style="background: #dfffdf"| TOWR18
|style="background: #dfffdf"| QLDR19
|style="background: #dfffdf"| QLDR20
|style="background: #dfffdf"| SMPR21
|style="background: #dfffdf"| BENR22
|style="background: #dfffdf"| BENR23
|style="background: #cfcfff"| SANQR
|style="background: #dfffdf"| SANR24
|style="background: #dfffdf"| BATR25
|style="background: #dfffdf"| SURR26
|style="background: #ffffff"| SURR27
|style="background: #dfffdf"| PUKR28
|style="background: #dfffdf"| PUKR29
|style="background: #dfffdf"| NEWR30
|style="background: #dfffdf"| NEWR31
! colspan=8|
! 12th
! 2192
|-
! 2019
! rowspan=2| Lee Holdsworth
|style="background: #dfffdf"| ADER1
|style="background: #dfffdf"| ADER2
|style="background: #dfffdf"| MELR3
|style="background: #dfffdf"| MELR4
|style="background: #dfffdf"| MELR5
|style="background: #dfffdf"| MELR6
|style="background: #dfffdf"| SYMR7
|style="background: #dfffdf"| SYMR8
|style="background: #dfffdf"| PHIR9
|style="background: #dfffdf"| PHIR10
|style="background: #dfffdf"| BARR11
|style="background: #dfffdf"| BARR12
|style="background: #dfffdf"| WINR13
|style="background: #dfffdf"| WINR14
|style="background: #dfffdf"| HIDR15
|style="background: #dfffdf"| HIDR16
|style="background: #dfffdf"| TOWR17
|style="background: #dfffdf"| TOWR18
|style="background: #dfffdf"| QLDR19
|style="background: #dfffdf"| QLDR20
|style="background: #dfffdf"| BENR21
|style="background: #dfffdf"| BENR22
|style="background: #dfffdf"| PUKR23
|style="background: #dfffdf"| PUKR24
|style="background: #dfffdf"| BATR25
|style="background: #dfffdf"| SURR26
|style="background: #dfffdf"| SURR27
|style="background: #dfffdf"| SANQR
|style="background: #ffdf9f"| SANR28
|style="background: #dfffdf"| NEWR29
|style="background: #dfffdf"| NEWR30
!colspan=9|
! 10th
! 2428
|-
! 2020
|style="background: #dfffdf"| ADER1
|style="background: #dfffdf"| ADER2
|style="background: #ffffff"| MELR3
|style="background: #ffffff"| MELR4
|style="background: #ffffff"| MELR5
|style="background: #ffffff"| MELR6
|style="background: #dfffdf"| SMP1R7
|style="background: #dfffdf"| SMP1R8
|style="background: #dfdfdf"| SMP1R9
|style="background: #dfdfdf"| SMP2R10
|style="background: #dfffdf"| SMP2R11
|style="background: #dfffdf"| SMP2R12
|style="background: #dfffdf"| HID1R13
|style="background: #dfffdf"| HID1R14
|style="background: #dfffdf"| HID1R15
|style="background: #dfffdf"| HID2R16
|style="background: #dfffdf"| HID2R17
|style="background: #dfffdf"| HID2R18
|style="background: #dfffdf"| TOW1R19
|style="background: #dfffdf"| TOW1R20
|style="background: #dfffdf"| TOW1R21
|style="background: #dfffdf"| TOW2R22 
|style="background: #dfffdf"| TOW2R23
|style="background: #dfffdf"| TOW2R24
|style="background: #dfffdf"| BEN1R25
|style="background: #dfffdf"| BEN1R26
|style="background: #dfffdf"| BEN1R27
|style="background: #dfffdf"| BEN2R28
|style="background: #efcfff"| BEN2R29
|style="background: #dfffdf"| BEN2R30
|style="background: #dfffdf"| BATR31
!colspan=9|
! 11th
! 1553
|-
! 2021
! Jack Le Brocq
|style="background: #dfffdf | BATR1
|style="background: #dfffdf | BATR2
|style="background: #dfffdf | SANR3
|style="background: #dfffdf | SANR4
|style="background: #dfffdf | SANR5
|style="background: #dfffdf | SYMR6
|style="background: #dfffdf | SYMR7
|style="background: #dfffdf | SYMR8
|style="background: #dfffdf | BENR9
|style="background: #dfffdf | BENR10
|style="background: #dfffdf | BENR11
|style="background: #dfffdf | HIDR12
|style="background: #dfffdf | HIDR13
|style="background: #dfffdf | HIDR14
|style="background: #dfffdf | TOWR15
|style="background: #dfffdf | TOWR16
|style="background: #dfffdf | TOW2R17
|style="background: #dfffdf | TOW2R18 
|style="background: #dfffdf | TOW2R19
|style="background: #dfffdf | SYD1R20
|style="background: #dfffdf | SYD1R21
|style="background: #dfffdf | SYD1R22
|style="background: #dfffdf | SYD2R23
|style="background: #dfffdf | SYD2R24
|style="background: #dfffdf | SYD2R25
|style="background: #dfffdf | SYD3R26
|style="background: #dfffdf | SYD3R27
|style="background: #dfffdf | SYD3R28
|style="background: #dfffdf | SYD4R29
|style="background: #ffffff | SYD4R30
|style="background: #dfffdf | BATR31
!colspan=9|
! 16th
! 1486
|-
! 2022
! rowspan=2| James Courtney
|style="background: #dfffdf | SMPR1
|style="background: #dfffdf"| SMPR2
|style="background: #dfffdf"| SYMR3
|style="background: #dfffdf | SYMR4
|style="background: #dfffdf | SYMR5
|style="background: #dfffdf | MELR6
|style="background: #dfffdf | MELR7
|style="background: #dfffdf | MELR8
|style="background: #dfffdf | MELR9
|style="background: #dfffdf | BARR10
|style="background: #dfffdf | BARR11
|style="background: #dfdfdf | BARR12
|style="background: #dfffdf | WINR13
|style="background: #dfffdf | WINR14|style="background: #dfffdf | WINR15
|style="background: #dfffdf | HIDR16
|style="background: #efcfff | HIDR17
|style="background: #dfffdf | HIDR18 
|style="background: #dfffdf | TOWR19
|style="background: #dfffdf | TOWR20
|style="background: #dfffdf | BENR21
|style="background: #ffdf9f | BENR22
|style="background: #dfffdf | BENR23
|style="background: #dfffdf | SANR24
|style="background: #dfffdf | SANR25
|style="background: #dfffdf | SANR26
|style="background: #dfffdf | PUKR27
|style="background: #dfffdf | PUKR28
|style="background: #efcfff | PUKR29
|style="background: #efcfff | BATR30
|style="background: #dfffdf | SURR31
|style="background: #dfffdf | SURR32
|style="background: #ffdf9f | ADER33
|style="background: #dfffdf | ADER34
!colspan=6|
! 12th
! 1748
|-
!2023
|style="background:#dfffdf | NEWR1
|style="background:#ffffff | NEWR2
|style="background: | MELR3
|style="background: | MELR4
|style="background: | MELR5
|style="background: | MELR6
|style="background: | BARR7
|style="background: | BARR8
|style="background: | BARR9
|style="background: | SYMR10
|style="background: | SYMR11
|style="background: | SYMR12
|style="background: | HIDR13
|style="background: | HIDR14
|style="background: | HIDR15
|style="background: | TOWR16
|style="background: | TOWR17
|style="background: | SMPR18 
|style="background: | SMPR19
|style="background: | SMPR20
|style="background: | BENR21
|style="background: | BENR22
|style="background: | BENR23
|style="background: | SANR24
|style="background: | BATR25
|style="background: | SURR26
|style="background: | SURR27
|style="background: | ADER28
|style="background: | ADER29
!colspan=11|
! style="background: | 
! style="background: |
|}

 Car No. 6 results 

 Car No. 56 results 

 Car No. 55 results 

Bathurst 1000 results

Supercars Championship drivers
The following is a list of drivers who have driven for the team in the Supercars Championship, in order of their first appearance. Drivers who only drove for the team on a part-time basis are listed in italics.

 Glenn Seton (2003–04)
 Craig Lowndes (2003–04)
 David Besnard (2003)
 Adam Macrow (2003–04)
 Darren Hossack (2003)
 Owen Kelly (2003, 2007)
 Alain Menu (2004)
 Greg Ritter (2005)
 Jason Bright (2005–06)
 David Brabham (2005–06)
 Cameron McLean (2005–06)
 Mark Winterbottom (2006–18)
 Matt Halliday (2006–07)
 Steven Richards (2007–13)
 Luke Youlden (2008–11)
 Dean Canto (2008–09, 2016–18)
 James Moffat (2010, 2018–present)
 Will Power (2010, 2012)
 Will Davison (2011–13, 2020)
 Richard Lyons (2011)
 Mika Salo (2011–12)
 John McIntyre (2012)
 Steve Owen (2013–15, 2018)
 Chaz Mostert (2014–15, 2018–19)
 Paul Morris (2014)
 Cameron Waters (2015–present)
 Russell Ingall (2015)
 Jack Le Brocq (2016, 2020–21)
  Richie Stanaway (2017–18)
 David Russell (2018)
  Lee Holdsworth (2019–20)
 Thomas Randle (2019, 2021–present)
 Michael Caruso (2019–20)
  James Courtney (2020–present)
 Broc Feeney (2020)
 Zak Best (2021–present)
 Jake Kostecki (2022)
 Kurt Kostecki (2022)
 Zane Goddard (2022)
 Declan Fraser (2023)Tyler Everingham (2023)

Super2 drivers
The following is a list of drivers who have driven for the team in the Super2 Series, in order of their first appearance. Drivers who only drove for the team on a part-time basis are listed in italics.

 James Moffat (2010)
 Chaz Mostert (2011–12)
 Cameron Waters (2014–15)
 Garry Jacobson (2016–17)
 Jack Le Brocq (2016)
 Josh Kean (2017)
 Richie Stanaway'' (2017)
 Thomas Randle (2018–19)
 Broc Feeney (2020)
 Zak Best (2021–22)
 Brad Vaughan (2023)
 Elly Morrow (2023)

Super2 Results

Car No. 78 results

Gallery

References

External links
Official Website

Australian auto racing teams
Sports organizations established in 2003
Sports teams in Victoria (Australia)
Supercars Championship teams
Organisations based in Melbourne
2003 establishments in Australia
[[Category:Australian racecar function objECT() { [NATIVE CODE] }S]]